The 1904 Copa del Rey Final was the second final of the Copa del Rey. It was supposed to be played in 1904 in Madrid. This edition was notable for its chaotic development and the fact that Athletic Bilbao won the trophy without playing a game.

Match details

Athletic Bilbao automatically qualified for the final.

Club Español de Madrid had tied one game and had not completed the other game in 1904 Copa del Rey, which led Athletic to file a complaint. Faced with this problem and unable to quickly solve the case, coupled with the rush of players from the Basque club to return to their occupations, the Madrid Association decided to award the cup to Athletic as defending champions.

References

Copa del Rey Finals
Copa Del Rey Final
Copa Del Rey Final 1904
Copa Del Rey Final 1904